"Designing Heaven" is a song by the British new wave and synth-pop band Heaven 17, which was released in 1996 as the lead single from their sixth studio album Bigger Than America. It was written by Glenn Gregory, Ian Craig Marsh and Martyn Ware, and produced by Marsh and Ware under their production company British Electric Foundation. The song peaked at No. 128 in the UK. It was the band's first single of new material since 1988. A music video was filmed to promote the single.

The DJ Dance Chart compiled exclusively for DJ Mag from a sample of over 500 British DJ returns ranked this single at No. 92.

Critical reception
Paul Fucito of AllMusic wrote: "The single "Designing Heaven" is as contemporary as anything Erasure, the Pet Shop Boys, or The Human League have done recently." David Richards of the American magazine The Lexicon wrote: "Try to get by the first single, "Designing Heaven". Maybe one day it will be considered a classic like "Let Me Go" or "Penthouse and Pavement", but it's doubtful. The song lacks energy or a good melody, seemingly constructed without a real master plan. There is also a German CD single for "Designing Heaven" with mixes by Motiv8 and Georgio Moroder. None of the remixes set the song on fire, but seem serviceable enough for clubs."

Formats
12" single
"Designing Heaven (Starck Mix)" - 8:33
"Designing Heaven (Le Courbosier Mix)" - 4:43
"Designing Heaven (Rodgers Mix)" - 7:00
"Designing Heaven (Mies Van Der Rohe Mix)" - 5:43

12" single (promo)
"Designing Heaven (Hysterix Pure Pumpin' Mix)" - 6:55
"Designing Heaven (Moroder's Subterranean Mix)" - 5:45

2x 12" single (German promo)
"Designing Heaven (Motiv-8's Vocal 12")" - 7:05
"Designing Heaven (Gregorio's 12" [Varispeed 130BPM])" - 6:07
"Designing Heaven (Moroder's Extended Mix)" - 6:45
"Designing Heaven (Motiv-8's Vocal Dub)" - 4:42
"Designing Heaven (Gregorio's 12")" - 6:23
"Designing Heaven (Moroder's Subterranean Mix)" - 5:45
"Designing Heaven (Trans European Heaven Mix)" - 4:50
"Designing Heaven (Motiv-8 Extended Instrumental)" - 7:25
"Designing Heaven (Motiv-8's Radio Edit)" - 3:54

CD single #1
"Designing Heaven (Radio Mix)" - 4:12
"Designing Heaven (Lloyd-Wright Mix - Motiv 8's Radio Mix)" - 4:10
"Designing Heaven (Le Corbusier Mix - Motiv 8's Dub 12)" - 4:42
"Designing Heaven (Trans European Heaven)" - 4:52
"Designing Heaven (Den Hemmel Designen)" - 4:27

CD single #2
"Designing Heaven (Meis Van Der Rohe Mix - Giorgio Moroder's Subterranean 12")" - 5:43
"Designing Heaven (Stark Mix - Gregorio's 12")" - 8:33
"Designing Heaven (Venturi Mix - Giorgio Moroder's Vocal 12")" - 6:46
"Designing Heaven (Rodgers Mix - James Reynold's Vocal 12")" - 7:00

CD single (UK promo)
"Designing Heaven (Radio Edit)" - 4:10

CD single (Germany promo)
"Designing Heaven (Pump Up Mix Edit)"

Chart performance

Personnel
Heaven 17
 Glenn Gregory - vocals
 Martyn Ware - keyboards
 Ian Craig Marsh - keyboards

Additional personnel
Chris Cox, Giorgio Moroder, Gregorio, Motiv 8, James Reynolds, Hysterix - remixes

References

1996 singles
Heaven 17 songs
Songs written by Martyn Ware
Songs written by Glenn Gregory
Songs written by Ian Craig Marsh
1996 songs
Warner Music Group singles